Adeleke Olorunnimbe Mamora  (born 16 February 1953) is a Nigerian politician, who is currently the Minister of Science and Technology, he previously served has  Minister of State of Health of Nigeria. He was elected Senator for the Lagos East constituency of Lagos State, Nigeria, taking office in June 2007. He is a member of the All Progressives Congress (APC).

He was a National Delegate for the National Republican Convention (NRC) in 1990, and Secretary, Lagos East of the United Nigeria Congress Party (UNCP) in 1998.
He was elected to the Lagos State House of Assembly in 1999, and was appointed Speaker. 
He was Chairman of the Conference of Speakers from 2000 to 2001.
Mamora was elected to the Senate  in April 2003, and reelected in 2007. He was also a member of the Economic Community of West African States (ECOWAS) Parliament from 2003 to 2006. In 2003, he was appointed chairman of the Senate Committee on Ethics, Privileges and Public Petitions.

After resuming his seat in the Senate in 2007, he was appointed to committees on Upstream Petroleum Resources, Selection Committee, 
Health and Federal Character & Inter-Government Affairs.
In a mid-term evaluation of Senators in May 2009, ThisDay noted that he had sponsored bills on Tenure of Office, Surgeon-General of Nigeria and repeal and amendment of the Tobacco Control Act. He sponsored or co-sponsored motions including one to amend Senate rule 111 to bring it into conformity with the Constitution of the Federal Republic of Nigeria. 
Mamora was described as a master of parliamentary procedures.

Early life and education
Mamora was born on 16 February 1953.
He obtained a B.Sc, Health Sciences, Bachelor of Medicine and Bachelor of Surgery (MBBS) University of Ife, Ile-Ife and became a Health Practitioner.
He was Medical Director of a Medical Centre (1987–1998), and a Company Medical Adviser (1988–1992).

References

Members of the Senate (Nigeria)
Living people
1953 births
Action Congress of Nigeria politicians
National Republican Convention politicians
United Nigeria Congress Party politicians
Physicians from Lagos
Lagos State politicians
Speakers of the Lagos State House of Assembly
20th-century Nigerian medical doctors
Obafemi Awolowo University alumni
21st-century Nigerian politicians
Yoruba politicians
Nigerian healthcare managers